Manitou is a general term for spirit beings among many Algonquian Native American groups.

Manitou or Manitu may also refer to:

Geography 
 Manitou Passage, Lake Michigan, USA
 Manitou, Manitoba, Canada
 Manitou, Kentucky, USA
 Manitou, North Dakota, USA
 Manitou, Oklahoma, USA
 Manitou Springs, Colorado
 Manitou Beach, Saskatchewan
 Manitou, New York, USA

Other uses 
 Léon Ashkenazi, French Rabbi and thinker of the 20th century also known as "Manitou"
 Manitou (Metro-North station), New York
 The Manitou, a 1978 American horror movie
 S/Y Manitou, John F. Kennedy's yacht
 Manitou Group, a France-based manufacturer of fork lifts and other heavy equipment

See also 
 
 Gitche Manitou, the Great Spirit among many Algonquian groups
 Gitchie Manitou State Preserve, a nature preserve in Lyon County, Iowa
 Manito (disambiguation)
 Manitou Island (disambiguation)
 Manitou Lake (disambiguation)
 Manitou Park (disambiguation)
 Manitou River (disambiguation)